The Australian National Handball Championship is a competition run each year by the Australian Handball Federation. It features teams from each state and territory in Australia.

Champions

Men's indoor - Sasha Dimitric Cup

Women's indoor

Men's Under 21 indoor

Women's Under 21 indoor

Boy's Under 18 indoor

Girls Under 18 indoor

Boy's Under 16 indoor

Girls Under 16 indoor

Boy's Under 14 indoor

Girls Under 14 indoor

Australian University Championship

Men

Mixed Division 1

Mixed Division 2 

See main article - Australian University Games

Australian Schools Championship

Boy's indoor

Girl's indoor

See also

Australian Handball Federation
Handball League Australia

References

External links
 Australian Handball webpage
 Handball Western Australia archives
 VHF. 2010-12 info
 Quest Newspapers. South East Advertiser. 18 October, 2012
 The Adelaide Advertiser. 19 September, 2012

Handball competitions in Oceania
Handball in Australia
Handball competitions in Australia